Peninsula High School may mean:
Peninsula High School (Washington), in Purdy, north of the city of Gig Harbor, Washington, USA
Peninsula High School (San Bruno), in San Bruno, California, USA
Palos Verdes Peninsula High School, in Rolling Hills Estates, California, USA